Axaxdərə (known as Oxoxdərə, Okhakhdara and Okhakhdere until 2001) is a village in the Zaqatala Rayon of Azerbaijan. The village forms part of the municipality of Car.

References

External links

Populated places in Zaqatala District